Bachri is a village in Jagdishpur block of Bhojpur district in Bihar, India. As of 2011, its population was 610, in 93 households.

References 

Villages in Bhojpur district, India